Mazzie Boyd is an American politician. She serves as a Republican member for the 2nd district of the Missouri House of Representatives.

Life and career 
Boyd attended St. Joseph Christian School and Missouri Western State University.

In August 2022, Boyd defeated Randy Railsback in the Republican primary election for the 2nd district of the Missouri House of Representatives. In November 2022, she defeated Lois Pontius in the general election, winning 82 percent of the votes. She assumed office in 2023.

References 

Living people
Year of birth missing (living people)
Place of birth missing (living people)
Republican Party members of the Missouri House of Representatives
21st-century American politicians
21st-century American women politicians
Women state legislators in Missouri